The 1947–48 SM-sarja season was the 17th season of the SM-sarja, the top level of ice hockey in Finland. Seven teams participated in the league, and Tarmo Hameenlinna won the championship.

Regular season

External links
 Season on hockeyarchives.info

Fin
Liiga seasons
1947–48 in Finnish ice hockey